Hoseynabad-e Bala may refer to:
 Hoseynabad-e Bala, Anbarabad, Kerman Province
 Hoseynabad-e Bala, Rafsanjan, Kerman Province